is a Japanese professional tennis player.

She achieved her career-high singles ranking of world No. 122 in January 2018. On 30 January 2017, she peaked at No. 30 in the WTA doubles rankings.

In her career, Kato has won three doubles titles on the WTA Tour and two WTA 125 doubles titles. On the ITF Circuit, she has won four singles and 13 doubles titles.

Playing for Japan Fed Cup team, Kato has win–loss record of 6–1, as of December 2022.

Personal life and background
Kato has one brother named Yuki. She started playing tennis at the age of eight. She has stated that her tennis idols growing up were Justine Henin and Roger Federer. Her favorite surface to play on is hardcourt, but her favorite tournament is Wimbledon.

Performance timelines

''Only main-draw results in WTA Tour, Grand Slam tournaments, Fed Cup/Billie Jean King Cup and Olympic Games are included in win–loss records and career statistics.

Doubles

WTA career finals

Singles: 1 (1 runner-up)

Doubles: 10 (3 titles, 7 runner-ups)

WTA Challenger finals

Doubles: 3 (2 titles, 1 runner-up)

ITF Circuit finals

Singles: 8 (4 titles, 4 runner–ups)

Doubles: 26 (13 titles, 13 runner–ups)

Junior Grand Slam finals

Girls' doubles: 1 (1 runner–up)

Notes

References

External links
 
 
 

1994 births
Living people
Japanese female tennis players
Sportspeople from Kyoto
Tennis players at the 2018 Asian Games
Medalists at the 2018 Asian Games
Asian Games medalists in tennis
Asian Games bronze medalists for Japan
21st-century Japanese women